Zane Tamane (née Teilāne; born September 24, 1983) is a Latvian women's basketball player currently playing for Nadezhda Orenburg and Latvia women's national basketball team.

Tamane, who is 2.00m tall, was the first female basketball player in Latvia to be able to slam dunk in practice. She has played for the Washington Mystics in the WNBA, and was in the 2012 training camp with the Phoenix Mercury, but was waived. She has also represented Western Illinois Leathernecks in the NCAA.

Western Illinois statistics
Source

References

External links
Profile at EuroBasket Women 2007 page
Profile at Euroleague Women 2009 page

1983 births
Living people
Basketball players at the 2008 Summer Olympics
Fenerbahçe women's basketball players
Latvian expatriate basketball people in Spain
Latvian expatriate basketball people in the United States
Latvian women's basketball players
Olympic basketball players of Latvia
Phoenix Mercury players
Basketball players from Riga
Washington Mystics players
Western Illinois Leathernecks women's basketball players